Sassoon Docks, built in 1875, is one of the oldest docks in Mumbai and was the  first wet dock constructed in Bombay. It is one of the few docks in the city open to the public. It is situated in Mumbai harbor in South Mumbai area of Colaba. It is one of largest fish markets in the Mumbai city. Its neighboring features are Mumbai Port Trust Garden (Sagar Upvan Colaba) and Offices of Fisheries Department, and it overlooks Oyster Rock, an island in the Mumbai harbour, at a distance.

History

Built in 1875 on reclaimed land, it was owned by the mercantile company David Sassoon & Co. The company was headed by Albert Abdullah David Sassoon (1818–1896), son of David Sassoon, a Baghdadi Jew and the leader of the Jewish community in Bombay. The Sassoon Docks were the first commercial wet dock in western India and helped establish the cotton trade. In 1879, Sassoon Docks and other associated foreshore properties were purchased by the government on behalf of Bombay Port Trust. The Sassoon Docks encouraged the Bombay Presidency to promote the construction of the large Prince's Dock. The Sassoon factories that produced silk and cotton goods in Bombay, also furnished employment for a large amount of native labor.

Street art
In 2017, street art transformed one of Mumbai’s oldest fishing docks into an exhibition space. Thirty artists from around the world gave the bustling 142-year-old Sassoon Dock, a colorful makeover as part of the St+art Urban Art Festival. The exhibition opened to public on 11 November 2017.

See also 
 David Sassoon Library

References

External links
 Sassoon Docks at wikimapia.

Mumbai docks